This is originated from balakaanda of Sri Ramayana, where the Teacher (Guru), Vishvamitra wakes up in the morning Sri Ram citing these words. It means "Excellent Kausalya's son Sri Rama".

These are the opening words of the Sri Venkateswara Suprabhatam to awaken Lord Venkateswara (Balaji). This is the first sloka rhymed while the temple doors are opened everyday morning for the first time at Bangaru vakili at Tirumala. The stanza starts as:

kausalyasuprajarama!

purva sandhya pravartate,

uttistha! narasardula!

kartavyam daivam ahnikam

It means O Lord, as the world is shining with the rising Sun's rays from east, please wake up O lion,  & start your Holy duties towards the well being of the Earth. This song was sung by M S Subbalakshmi

Meaning as Vishvamitra cite this rhyme is: "Excellent son of Kausalya, Sri Rama, as the night is turning to dawn, arise to perform your responsibilities, starting with offering holy prayers (Sandhya vandanam) to the Gods"

References
 Tirumala.org- Tirumala Tirupati Devasthanams

Hindu texts
Hindu prayer and meditation